Cyfrinach y Bedyddwyr was a 19th-century monthly Welsh language magazine, first produced by its founder, Baptist minister John Jenkins (1779–1853), in Merthyr Tydfil in 1827. Its contents were aimed at members of the Baptist congregations of Glamorganshire and Monmouthshire.

References 

Periodicals published in Wales
Welsh-language magazines
Music magazines published in the United Kingdom